The Dryad-class torpedo gunboat was the last class of torpedo gunboat built for the Royal Navy.  This type of vessel was rapidly replaced by the faster torpedo boat destroyer, and all of the class were converted to minesweepers during World War I, with the exception of Hazard, which became a submarine depot ship.

Design
Ordered under the Naval Defence Act of 1889, which established the "Two-Power Standard", the ships were contemporary with the first torpedo boat destroyers, a type which subsequently superseded the torpedo gunboats.

Machinery
They were equipped with two sets of vertical triple-expansion steam engines, with two locomotive-type boilers, driving through twin screws. They carried between 100 and 160 tons of coal and were manned by 120 sailors and officers.

Armament
The armament when built comprised two QF  guns, four 6-pounder guns and a single 5-barrelled Nordenfelt machine gun.  Hussar as built mounted only one QF 4.7-inch gun, two 12-pounders and one 6-pounder.  The primary weapon was five 18-inch (450-mm) torpedo tubes, with two reloads.  On conversion to minesweepers in 1914 two of the five torpedoes were removed.

Ships

See also 
 ARA Patria

Notes

References

Bibliography

 
Ship classes of the Royal Navy
Torpedo gunboat classes
 Dryad